Events from the year 1904 in France.

Incumbents
President: Émile Loubet
President of the Council of Ministers: Emile Combes

Events
23 February - First launch of a French diesel-powered submarine, Aigrette.
8 April - Entente cordiale, a series of agreements signed between the United Kingdom and France.
 Global cosmetics companies are founded in Paris: Coty, by François Coty, and Garnier, by Alfred Amour Garnier.

Arts and literature
 Summer - Henri Matisse paints Luxe, Calme et Volupté at Saint-Tropez; it will be considered foundational in his own oeuvre and the starting point of Fauvism.

Sport
2 July - The second Tour de France begins.
24 July - Tour de France ends, won by Henri Cornet.

Births

January to March
7 January - Pierre Allain, climber (died 2000)
13 January - Jean de Beaumont, sport shooter (died 2002)
14 January - Henri-Georges Adam, engraver and sculptor (died 1967)
4 February - Georges Sadoul, journalist and cinema writer (died 1967)
11 February - Lucile Randon, supercentenarian (died 2023)
15 February - Louis Robert, historian and author (died 1985)
24 February - Gaston Marie Jacquier, Roman Catholic prelate (died 1976)
27 February - André Leducq, cyclist, twice Tour de France winner (died 1980)
1 March - Paul Dubreil, mathematician (died 1994)
13 March - René Dumont, agronomist, sociologist and environmental politician (died 2001)

April to June
12 April - Arsène Alancourt, cyclist (died 1965)
13 April - Yves Congar, priest and theologian (died 1995)
21 April
Jean Hélion, painter and author (died 1987)
Gabriel Loire, stained glass artist (died 1996)
25 April - René Cogny, General (died 1968)
17 May - Jean Gabin, actor (died 1976)
18 May - François Marty, Roman Catholic Cardinal (died 1994)
19 May - Daniel Guérin, anarchist and author (died 1988)
25 May - Marcel Thil, world champion boxer (died 1968)
8 June - Jean-Jérôme Adam, Roman Catholic Archbishop of Libreville (died 1981)
11 June - Gaston Charlot, chemist (died 1994)
29 June - Jean Berveiller, composer and organist (died 1976)

July to September
2 July - René Lacoste, tennis player (died 1996)
8 July - Henri Cartan, mathematician. (died 2008)
24 July - Leo Arnaud, composer of film scores (died 1991)
4 September - Christian-Jaque, filmmaker (died 1994)
7 September - Henri Pinault, Roman Catholic Bishop of Chengdu (died 1987)
18 September - Jean Dasté, actor and theatre director (died 1994)

October to December
8 October - Yves Giraud-Cabantous, motor racing driver (died 1973)
13 October - Antoine Gilles Menier, businessman and municipal politician (died 1967)
14 October - Christian Pineau, French Resistance leader and politician (died 1995)
12 November
Henri-Irénée Marrou, historian (died 1977)
Jacques Tourneur, film director (died 1977)
22 November - Louis Néel, physicist, the Nobel Prize for Physics in 1970 (died 2000)
6 December - Ève Curie, author and writer, daughter of Marie and Pierre Curie (died 2007)
12 December - Nicolas de Gunzburg, magazine editor (died 1981)
21 December - Jean René Bazaine, painter, stained glass window designer and writer (died 2001)
31 December - Charles Fauvel, aircraft designer (died 1979)

Full date unknown
Raymond Molinier, Trotskyist (died 1994)

Deaths
10 January - Jean-Léon Gérôme, painter and sculptor (born 1824)
26 January - Émile Deschanel, author and politician (born 1819)
3 February - Marie Firmin Bocourt, zoologist and artist (born 1819)
19 May - Auguste Molinier, historian (born 1851)
27 June - Anatole Jean-Baptiste Antoine de Barthélemy, archaeologist and numismatist (born 1821)
25 August - Henri Fantin-Latour, painter and lithographer (born 1836)
23 September - Émile Gallé, artist (born 1846)
4 October - Frédéric Bartholdi, sculptor, designer of the Statue of Liberty (born 1834)

Full date unknown
Paul Adolphe Marie Prosper Granier de Cassagnac, journalist and politician (born 1843)

See also
 List of French films before 1910

References

1900s in France